Prochoreutis brunescens is a moth in the family Choreutidae. It was described by Alexey Diakonoff in 1978. It is found on Kyushu in Japan.

References

External Links 
Natural History Museum Lepidoptera generic names catalog

Prochoreutis
Moths described in 1978